Ka'í Ladrillo is a typical dessert of the Paraguayan cuisine prepared mainly with peanuts and molasses.

Origin of the name
The name ka’i ladrillo is the result of the combination of two words, “ka’i” that means “monkey” and “ladrillo” that is brick, used to refer to all things with that shape. So the “ka’i ladrillo” is the “brick of the monkey” because it is usually made with a rectangular form like a brick and because the monkey (ka’i mirikina) is an animal natural of the Paraguayan jungles that likes to eat everything that is sweet. And this dessert is especially sweet. It is also called “azukapé manduví”, Guaraní words for “sugar” (azuká), “flat” (pé) and “peanut” (manduví).

Preparation

To prepare the ka’i ladrillo are needed: toast peanuts and molasses. Some varieties of the dish also include a little of sour orange or grapefruit juice, which give it a bittersweet taste and diminishes the excessive sweetness.

Ingredients
The molasses is boiled, stirring, until it became possible to see the bottom of the pot when passing the spoon. Then, add the peanut, whole or in little pieces (the traditional is made with whole peanuts) and is cooked for a few more minutes. After, the preparation is poured in flat molds previously damped with some cold water, and let it cool. Once cold, the dessert is taken out of the molds.

According to some scholars of social history of Paraguay, all the Paraguayan popular gastronomy, which establishes itself as a small family industry after the Paraguayan War where Paraguay fought the Triple Alliance composed of (Argentina, Brazil and Uruguay, between 1864 and 1870), is really abundant in caloric content, because of the situation that overcame to the country after the conflict. In the aftermath of the war, food was limited, groceries were hard to find. So Paraguayan cooking has a high protein content to make up for the scarcity of every day meal.

References

External links
Guarani Raity

Paraguayan cuisine
Confectionery
Molasses